Cendrieux is a former commune in the Dordogne department, Nouvelle-Aquitaine, southwestern France. On 1 January 2017, it was merged into the new commune Val de Louyre et Caudeau.

Population

Monuments

 Château de la Pommerie

See also
Communes of the Dordogne department

References

Former communes of Dordogne